Arne Sandnes (2 March 1924 – 23 May 2016) was a Norwegian politician for the Centre Party.

Sandnes was elected to Snåsa municipality council in 1952, and later became mayor. Sandnes served as county mayor of Nord-Trøndelag(1975-1991).

He was the brother of history professor Jørn Sandnes.

References

1924 births
2016 deaths
Mayors of places in Nord-Trøndelag
Chairmen of County Councils of Norway
Centre Party (Norway) politicians
People from Snåsa